Antoine Paillet (1626–1701) was a French painter. He was inducted into the Académie royale de peinture et de sculpture on August 2, 1759. Some of his paintings can be found at the Musée des Augustins in Toulouse or the Palace of Versailles near Paris.

References

1626 births
1701 deaths
French painters